José Luis Meléndez García (born September 2, 1965 in Naguabo, Puerto Rico) is a former pitcher in Major League Baseball who played from 1990 through 1994 for the Seattle Mariners (1990), San Diego Padres (1991–92) and Boston Red Sox (1993–94). Listed at 6' 2", 175 lb., Meléndez batted and threw right-handed.

Career
In a five-season career, Meléndez posted a 16–14 record with 172 strikeouts and a 3.47 ERA in 109 appearances, including 12 starts, 37 games finished, three save, and 220⅔ innings of work.

Meléndez also pitched in the Pittsburgh, Seattle, San Diego, Boston, Kansas City and New York Yankees minor league systems from 1984 to 1996. In 12 seasons he went 69–55 with 796 strikeouts and a 3.76 ERA in 891 innings.

External links

1969 births
Living people
Boston Red Sox players
Calgary Cannons players
Major League Baseball pitchers
Major League Baseball players from Puerto Rico
Pan American Games medalists in baseball
Pan American Games bronze medalists for Puerto Rico
Pawtucket Red Sox players
People from Naguabo, Puerto Rico
Puerto Rican expatriate baseball players in Canada
San Diego Padres players
Seattle Mariners players
Baseball players at the 1987 Pan American Games
Medalists at the 1987 Pan American Games
Harrisburg Senators players
Las Vegas Stars (baseball) players
Leones de Yucatán players
Puerto Rican expatriate baseball players in Mexico
Omaha Royals players
Prince William Pirates players
Salem Buccaneers players
Scranton/Wilkes-Barre Red Barons players
Watertown Pirates players
Williamsport Bills players